The following are lists of affiliates of the American Broadcasting Company (ABC) television network:

List of ABC television affiliates (by U.S. state)
List of ABC television affiliates (table)
List of former ABC television affiliates

See also
Lists of CBS television affiliates
Lists of Fox television affiliates
Lists of NBC television affiliates